Melisoides is a genus of moths in the family Erebidae. It contains only one species, Melisoides lobata, which is found in Cameroon, the Democratic Republic of Congo and Equatorial Guinea.

The wingspan is about 43 mm for males and 47 mm for females. Both wings are lustrous deep bronzy purple, extending to a slight extent to the head and thorax.

References

External links
Natural History Museum Lepidoptera generic names catalog

Syntomini
Monotypic moth genera
Moths described in 1912
Erebid moths of Africa